Peter McCambridge is a Canadian literary translator. He is most noted for Songs for the Cold of Heart, his translation of Éric Dupont's novel La fiancée américaine, for which he was a shortlisted finalist for the Governor General's Award for French to English translation at the 2018 Governor General's Awards.

The novel was also shortlisted for the 2018 Giller Prize.

Born and raised in Ireland, McCambridge was educated at Cambridge University and has been based in Quebec City since 2003. He is the fiction editor of QC Fiction, an imprint of Baraka Books which specializes in English translations of Quebec literature.

References

External links

Canadian translators
Canadian book publishers (people)
Irish emigrants to Canada
Alumni of the University of Cambridge
Writers from Quebec City
Anglophone Quebec people
Living people
Year of birth missing (living people)